MC Oran is an Algerian football club.

MC Oran (نادي مولودية وهران) may also refer to: 

MC Oran (basketball)
MC Oran (handball)